John Caplyn (died c. 1603), of Southampton, was an English politician.

Family
Caplyn was the son of John Caplyn, MP for Bodmin and Southampton.

Career
He was a Member (MP) of the Parliament of England for Winchester in 1572.

References

16th-century births
1600s deaths
English MPs 1572–1583
Politicians from Southampton

Year of birth unknown
Year of death uncertain